Ngarua is a rural community in the Matamata-Piako District and Waikato region of New Zealand's North Island.

It is located south-east of Tatuanui, west of Morrinsville and north of Waharoa and Matamata on State Highway 27.

The Tatua Dairy factory, in Tatuanui, is an independent co-operative owned by 114 shareholder farms from the Tatuanui and Ngarua area, all located within a 12 kilometre radius of the processing site. It exports specialist dairy products to more than 60 countries.

History

20th century

Ngarua developed as a dairy farming community around its first community hall, opened in 1908. The hall was extended in 1913 and was doubled in size in 1932. It hosted dances, concerts and community gatherings.

Ronald Candy began working on his father's Hubert Candy's farm in 1921, and took over the management of the farm in 1925. He turned the rough and poorly drained peat into productive farmland, tested his cows for butterfat production, and experimented with different fertilisers. In 1926, he started a Ngarua herd-testing group, becoming a pioneer in herd improvement. In the following years he became an early advocate for heavy top-dressing, adequate sub-division, good drainage and rotational grazing.

A Ngarua unit of the Home Guard was established for the Second World War. In 1946 the Ngarua District Roll of Honour and Roll of Service was unveiled in the community hall, commemorating local men who had died in both world wars.

In 1956, the Ngarua Memorial Hall was opened alongside the existing hall.

Candy's Ngarua farm, Somersby, went on to become a showplace for high production and one of the first examples of dairy beef production. He and many of his farm workers became dairy industry leaders. Candy retired from many of his public positions in 1968 and committed suicide on his Ngarua farm in 1974.

21st century

The memorial hall was closed about 2005 and was sold to private owners in 2009. It was ultimately demolished in 2020.

The settlement's roll of honour was moved to the Ngarua Community Church. It was later transferred to Morrinsville Museum.

The area still consists of several dairy farms, like the fourth-generation Brown dairy farm.

Education

There was previously a Ngarua School, established in 1907.

References

Matamata-Piako District
Populated places in Waikato